The Neftchi Baku 2007–08 season was Neftchi Baku's sixteenth Azerbaijan Premier League season. They started the season under the management of Gurban Gurbanov who was replaced by Vlastimil Petržela after the UEFA Cup qualifiers  at the start of September. Petržela was replaced by Anatoliy Demyanenko on 5 January 2008. They finished 3rd  in the league and were knocked out of the Azerbaijan Cup at the semifinal stage by Inter Baku. Neftchi also took part in the UEFA Cup, being eliminated at the First qualifying round by SV Ried of Austria.

Squad

Transfers

Summer

In:

Out:

Winter

In:

 

Out:

Competitions

Azerbaijan Premier League

Results

Table

Azerbaijan Cup

UEFA Cup

Qualifying rounds

Squad statistics

Appearances and goals

|-
|colspan="14"|Players who appeared for Neftchi Baku who left during the season:

|}

Goal scorers

Notes
Qarabağ have played their home games at the Tofiq Bahramov Stadium since 1993 due to the ongoing situation in Quzanlı.
Neftchi Baku awarded the win.

References

External links 
 Neftchi Baku at Soccerway.com

Neftçi PFK seasons
Neftchi Baku